Ally Miller (born 24 January 1936) is a Scottish former footballer, who played for Third Lanark, St Mirren, Brighton & Hove Albion, Norwich City, Berwick Rangers, Dumbarton and Hamilton Academical. Miller was part of the St Mirren team that won the 1959 Scottish Cup Final.

References

Sources
 

1936 births
Living people
Footballers from Glasgow
Association football wingers
Scottish footballers
Third Lanark A.C. players
St Mirren F.C. players
Brighton & Hove Albion F.C. players
Norwich City F.C. players
Berwick Rangers F.C. players
Dumbarton F.C. players
Hamilton Academical F.C. players
Scottish Football League players
English Football League players